Nicolaas "Nico" Hessel Rienks (born 1 February 1962) is a former rower from the Netherlands and two-time Olympic gold medallist.

Rienks won the gold medal in the men's double sculls at the 1988 Summer Olympics, alongside Ronald Florijn. At the 1996 Summer Olympics, he repeated his gold medal performance winning the eight with coxswain event with the Holland Acht (Holland Eight). He also competed at the 1984 and 2000 Olympics but finished outside the podium.

With Henk-Jan Zwolle he won the gold medal in the double sculls competition at the 1991 World Rowing Championships. He also won three silver medals at the world championships in 1989 (double sculls), 1994 and 1995 (eights).

He was named 'Dutch Rower of the Century' and is an honorary member of the Dutch Rowing Federation. In 2004, Rienks was awarded the Thomas Keller Medal by the International Rowing Federation.

References

1962 births
Living people
Dutch male rowers
Olympic rowers of the Netherlands
Olympic gold medalists for the Netherlands
Olympic bronze medalists for the Netherlands
Olympic medalists in rowing
Rowers at the 1984 Summer Olympics
Rowers at the 1988 Summer Olympics
Rowers at the 1992 Summer Olympics
Rowers at the 1996 Summer Olympics
Rowers at the 2000 Summer Olympics
People from Tiel
Sportspeople from Gelderland
World Rowing Championships medalists for the Netherlands
Medalists at the 1996 Summer Olympics
Medalists at the 1992 Summer Olympics
Medalists at the 1988 Summer Olympics
Thomas Keller Medal recipients